FC Kolos Bykovo was a Russian football team from Bykovo, Volgograd Oblast. It played professionally for one season in 1994 in the Russian Third League.

External links
  Team history at KLISF

Association football clubs established in 1993
Association football clubs disestablished in 1995
Defunct football clubs in Russia
Sport in Volgograd Oblast
1993 establishments in Russia
1995 disestablishments in Russia